The Girls' 3m springboard competition was held on August 23 at 20:30. 13 competitors featured this event. Earlier that day there were preliminaries to determine the finalists (13:30 local time).

Medalists

Results

References
 Preliminary Results
 Final Results

Diving at the 2010 Summer Youth Olympics
Youth